"My Uncle Used to Love Me But She Died" is a 1966 song by Roger Miller.  It was the fourth of four singles released from Miller's fourth LP, Words and Music, all of which became U.S. Top 40 Country hits.

Chart history
The song became a hit in the U.S. on both the Billboard Hot 100 (#58) and Country (#39) charts.  On Cash Box it reached #45.  The song was a bigger hit in Canada, where it peaked at number 26 on the Pop singles chart.

Lyrical content
Miller was raised by his aunt and uncle.  He later rewrote the song, changing the nonsensical but suggestive lyrics about an "uncle" to "mama" instead, as included on his 1973 album Dear Folks, Sorry I Haven't Written Lately.

Chart performance

References

External links
 Lyrics of this song
 

Songs about death
1966 songs
1966 singles
LGBT-related songs
Novelty songs
Roger Miller songs
Smash Records singles
Song recordings produced by Jerry Kennedy
Songs written by Roger Miller